Adalia may refer to:

People with the surname
 Khryss Adalia (1946–2008), Filipino film director

Other uses
 The ancient name of Antalya, Turkey
 "Adalia" (character), a fictional character in songs by Madina Lake
 Adalia (genus), a genus of ladybirds in the family Coccinellidae

See also
 Attalia (disambiguation)